The City is a 1977 American made-for-television crime drama film starring Robert Forster, Ward Costello, Don Johnson, Jimmy Dean and Mark Hamill. The film was produced as a pilot for a proposed television series that never came to be. It was originally broadcast January 12, 1977, on NBC.

Plot
The film is about the day in the life of two detectives (Robert Forster as Lieutenant Matt Lewis, Ward Costello as Captain Lloyd Bryant, and later Don Johnson as Sergeant Brian Scott) in Los Angeles solving (in this particular case) a crime where a man is killed for unknown reasons, coming to find an unstable young man (Mark Hamill as Eugene Banks) with a deep hatred against a famous country singer (Jimmy Dean as Wes Collins).

Cast
Robert Forster as Lieutenant Matt Lewis
Don Johnson as Sergeant Brian Scott
Ward Costello as Captain Lloyd Bryant
Jimmy Dean as Wes Collins
Mark Hamill as Eugene Banks
Susan Sullivan as Carol Carter
Adam Hollander as Kenny
Adam Rich as Donnie Collins

External links
 

1977 television films
1977 films
1977 crime drama films
American crime drama films
Television films as pilots
Television pilots not picked up as a series
NBC network original films
Films directed by Harvey Hart
1970s American films